Fred William Lindley (born 1878) was an English carpenter, trade unionist, and Labour Party politician, sitting as MP for Rotherham from 1923 to 1931.

Early life
Lindley was born 6 May 1878 in Rawmarsh near Rotherham, and went to school in Rotherham and Sheffield.

Politics
Lindley helped found the Rotherham branch of the Independent Labour Party and the Sheffield Labour Representation Committee. He was elected at the 1923 general election as the Member of Parliament (MP) for Rotherham, defeating the sitting Conservative MP Frederic Arthur Kelley. Lindley held the seat until his defeat at the 1931 general election by the Conservative George Herbert.

Work
He briefly clerked for a pawnbroker, but became an apprentice joiner in 1895. He was a trade unionist with the Amalgamated Society of Carpenters and Joiners from the age of 21, when he also joined the Independent Labour Party (ILP), serving on the union's national executive and as organiser of the Sheffield, Rotherham, and Barnsley district.

References

External links 

1878 births
Year of death missing
20th-century deaths
Amalgamated Society of Woodworkers-sponsored MPs
People from Rotherham
Labour Party (UK) MPs for English constituencies
UK MPs 1923–1924
UK MPs 1924–1929
UK MPs 1929–1931
English carpenters